Gymnastics events have been staged at the Olympic Games since 1896. Hungarian female gymnasts have participated in every Summer Olympics since 1928, except for 1932 and 1984. A total of 50 female gymnasts have represented Hungary. Hungarian women have won 23 medals at the Olympics – 5 in team all-around, 2 in team portable apparatus, 2 in individual all-around, 2 in balance beam, 5 in floor exercise, 5 in uneven bars, and 2 in vault. The medals include 7 golds.

Five Hungarian female gymnasts have won at least four medals at the Olympic Games: Ágnes Keleti (10), Margit Korondi (8), Olga Lemhényi-Tass (6), Erzsébet Gulyás-Köteles (5), and Andrea Molnár-Bodó (4).

Ágnes Keleti competed at the 1952 and 1956 Olympics and won 10 total medals, more than any other Hungarian female gymnast. She won four medals in 1952, including the floor exercise gold, and then followed that up by winning six medals in 1956, including golds on balance beam, floor exercise, and uneven bars. Margit Korondi also competed at the 1952 and 1956 Games. She won six medals in 1952 and two in 1956.

From 1948 to 1960, Olga Lemhényi-Tass competed at four Olympic Games, the most of any Hungarian female gymnast. She won six total medals. Erzsébet Gulyás-Köteles participated in three Olympics from 1948 to 1956 and won five total medals. Andrea Molnár-Bodó won four total medals at the 1952 and 1956 Games.

After 1956, no Hungarian female gymnast won a gold medal until 1992. That year, Henrietta Ónodi earned two medals, including the gold in vault.

Gymnasts

Medalists

References

Hungary
Gymnasts
Olympic